William Ferrari (April 21, 1901 – September 10, 1962) was an American art director. He won an Oscar and was nominated for another in the category Best Art Direction. He died in 1962 and was buried at the Forest Lawn, Hollywood Hills Cemetery in Los Angeles

Selected filmography
Ferrari won an Academy Awards for Best Art Direction and was nominated for another:
Won
 Gaslight (1944)
Nominated
 How the West Was Won (1962)

References

External links

1901 births
1962 deaths
American art directors
Best Art Direction Academy Award winners
Burials at Forest Lawn Memorial Park (Hollywood Hills)
Emmy Award winners